The following is a list of foreign ministers of Spain, since 1808 until now serving in Spain's Ministry of Foreign Affairs.

Kingdom of Spain (1808–73)

Ministers of State (1820–23/1834–73) and Secretaries of the Office of State (1808–20/1823–34)
Political Persuasion:

First Spanish Republic (1873–74)

Ministers of State
Political Persuasion:

Kingdom of Spain (1874–1931)

Ministers of State (1874–1928)
Political Persuasion:

President and Minister of Foreign Affairs (1928–30)
Political Persuasion:

Ministers of State (1930–31)
Political Persuasion:

Second Spanish Republic (1931–39)

Ministers of State
Political Persuasion:

Francoist Spain (1939–75)

Ministers of Foreign Affairs
Political Persuasion:

Kingdom of Spain (since 1975)

Ministers of Foreign Affairs (1975–2004)
Political Persuasion:

Ministers of Foreign Affairs and Cooperation (2004–2018)
Political Persuasion:

Ministers of Foreign Affairs, European Union and Cooperation (since 2018)
Political Persuasion:

Sources

See also
 Foreign relations of Spain

Notes and references
Notes

References

Lists of government ministers of Spain
Main